The Gowind design is a family of steel monohull frigates, corvettes  and offshore patrol vessels developed since 2006 by France's Naval Group, formerly known as DCNS, to conduct missions in the littoral zone such as anti-submarine warfare (ASW).

The Gowind design can deploy unmanned aerial vehicles (UAVs), unmanned surface vehicles (USVs) and underwater unmanned vehicles (UUVs). An aft deck has been provided allowing for a 10-ton class helicopter or UAV operations.

The platform's weapon system consists of a multi-functional radar and VL MICA surface-to-air missiles (SAM). It is armed with Exocet anti-ship missiles. The propulsion system is based on Combined Diesel and Diesel (CODAD) and includes water-jets for improved maneuverability in shallow waters and high-speed performance. There is no funnel on these ships. The radar and other sensors are mounted on a single central mast thus allowing 360-degree view. Naval Group offers two variants of the design: Gowind 1000 and Gowind 2500 while Malaysia with the assistance of Naval Group locally developed the Gowind 3100.

As of October 2021, the Greek government is in discussions with Naval Group about the acquisition of up to seven Gowind corvettes with three of them being built in Greece.

Product reorganisation 

The Gowind class originally consisted of offshore patrol vessels (OPVs) but after a rearrangement of products Naval Group decided to remove the OPV from the Gowind class and develop the OPVs as a class of their own with  top of the range. To do so it formed the Kership joint venture with the Piriou shipyard in Concarneau, Brittany in May 2013 to build and market lightly armed and armoured OPVs for customs, fishing and other home security missions. Naval Group said this would enable it to concentrate on "developing relations" with clients seeking heavily armed and armoured warships while Kership handles the more civilian-standard OPVs.

Class specifications

Gowind 1000 
The Gowind 1000 is a 1,000-ton corvette designed for protection, escort and embargo naval missions in a littoral environment. The Gowind 1000 can also perform presence, surveillance, intelligence and policing missions. It is armed with:
 1 x OTO Melara 76 mm main gun
 2 x Nexter Narwhal 20 mm cannon
 8 x VLS for MBDA VL MICA surface-to-air missiles
 4 x MBDA MM40 Exocet anti-ship missile launchers

Sensors:
Integrated mast to integrate most sensors in a low observable design

Gowind 2500 
The Gowind 2500 multi-mission corvette is designed for surveillance, surface and subsurface combat, protection and escort naval missions. It can also perform presence, maritime surveillance and policing missions against trafficking and piracy.

The Gowind 2500 capitalizes on Naval Group's expertise in vessel stealth.
The vessel is equipped with facilities for an embarked helicopter and drones. It is armed with:
 1 × OTO Melara 76 mm main gun
 2 × Nexter Narwhal 20 mm cannon
 16 × VLS for MBDA VL MICA surface-to-air missiles
 8 × MBDA MM40 Exocet anti-ship missile launchers
 2 × triple torpedo launchers

Electronic warfare & decoys for Egypt's Gowind 2500:
 Vigile 200 Tactical R-ESM System
 Altesse Naval C-ESM
 Sylena MK2 decoy launcher system

Gowind 3100 
It is armed with:
 1 × Bofors 57 mm main gun
 2 × MSI DS30M 30 mm cannon
 16 × VLS for MBDA VL MICA surface-to-air missiles 
 8 × Naval Strike Missile anti-ship missile launchers
 2 × triple torpedo launcher

Operators

Egypt

In 2014, Egypt signed a €1bn contract with Naval Group to buy four Gowind 2,500-ton corvettes with an option for two more. Separately, MBDA negotiated a contract to equip the ships with MICA vertical launch air-defense missiles and MM40 Block 3 Exocet anti-ship missiles, together worth an additional 400 million euros, while Naval Group negotiated a 100–200 million euro contract for torpedoes. Three of the corvettes are to be built locally by Alexandria Shipyard within a technology transfer agreement. It was apparently President Abdel Fattah el-Sisi who decided these were the ships he wanted rather than the Meko A200 being offered by German group ThyssenKrupp Marine Systems (TKMS) or the Sigma corvette proposed by Damen of the Netherlands. Egypt is in talks with France to acquire another two Gowind corvettes which, if ordered, would be produced by France in Lorient.

In April 2015, Naval Group started cutting metal for the very first Gowind 2500 corvette, with a planned construction period of 29 months. It is the first of a series of four units that will be delivered to Egypt before 2019. The corvette's first block was laid in the dry dock in September 2015. Naval Group celebrated the launch of the first Egyptian Gowind corvette El Fateh at the Lorient naval shipyard in September 2016. El Fateh successfully concluded its first sea trials by the end of March 2017. The Egyptian Navy took delivery of the vessel in September 2017, three years after the order was placed.

Alexandria Shipyard started cutting metal for the second Gowind corvette intended for the Egyptian Navy in April 2016, it is the first corvette to be built locally in Egypt. Naval Group sent supervision and technical assistance teams, technical data and necessary components to Alexandria for assisting Egypt in the local construction of the three corvettes. The company also provided training for the Egyptian staff at its site in Lorient. All the Panoramic Sensors and Intelligence Modules (PSIM) were produced and tested in Lorient by Naval Group and later shipped to Alexandria for installation on the corvettes. The launching ceremony of the second Gowind corvette Port Said took place in September 2018 in Alexandria.

Construction work on the third vessel has already started, its first block was laid in the dry dock by July 2018.

Malaysia

Malaysia is locally designing and building six stealth frigates displacing 3,100 tons and length 111 meter based on the design of the Gowind corvette. In 2023, it is confirmed that Malaysia will only build five instead of six ship after the sixth ship were cancelled.

Argentina
Argentina chose the OPV variant (Kership design). After repeated negotiations and break-offs, in February 2018 the Argentine Navy was instructed to restart negotiations with Naval Group for the procurement of four Gowind-class vessels. The decision was motivated by the meeting between Argentine President Mauricio Macri and French President Emmanuel Macron at the annual World Economic Forum summit in Davos, Switzerland. An order for four vessels was expected in July 2018. In November 2018, Argentina confirmed the purchase of four Gowind-class vessels. The purchase includes the already-built , which in 2016 visited the region on a marketing trip, and three new vessels.

United Arab Emirates
In 2019 March 25, the United Arab Emirates Navy had signed a contract with Naval Group for Euro750 million (USD850m) for two 2500 class frigates (actually weighing 2,700 tonnes) with options for two more, to be built in partnership with Abu Dhabi Ship Building Company (ADSB). They will be equipped with Naval Group's SETIS combat management system, MBDA's Exocet missile, Raytheon's Evolved Sea Sparrow missiles. This contract was announced in mid-June 2019 by Naval Group.

Romania

In July 2019, Naval Group won a €1.2 billion contract, which includes the construction of four new Gowind multi-mission corvettes for the Romanian Navy, as well as a new maintenance center and a training center. Naval Group was due to build the first corvette within three years, while the remaining three corvettes would be constructed by Constanța Shipyard and be delivered before 2026. However, this deal had not concluded .

Potential operators

Indonesia
In January 2020 the Indonesian Minister of Defence Prabowo Subianto, during a bilateral meeting in France with his French counterpart Florence Parly, said the Indonesian Ministry is interested in French military equipment; including 36 Dassault Rafale aircraft, (in negotiation)  submarines, and 2 Gowind corvettes. On 7 June 2021, Indonesia signed a letter of intent to buy two Gowind corvettes from France.

Greece 
, Greece is interested in 5 Gowind 2800HN corvettes based on the Gowind 2500 for the Hellenic Navy as part of a $5 billion defence package.

See also 
 Littoral combat ship
 
 
 MILGEM project
 
 
 
 
 Doha-class corvette

References

External links 
 Alexandria shipyard
 Gowind Official website
 DCNS presented an export version of its FREMM Frigate and its Gowind range at Euronaval

 
Ship types
Corvettes of the Egyptian Navy